Sunday Airlines is a charter airline in Kazakhstan and a subsidiary of SCAT Airlines. Its main base is Almaty International Airport.

History
The airline was established and started operations in 2013.

Destinations

Fleet

As of December 2022, the Sunday Airlines fleet consists of the following aircraft:

See also
 List of airlines of Kazakhstan

References

External links

Official website

Airlines of Kazakhstan
Airlines established in 2013
2013 establishments in Kazakhstan